Akbar Jiskani (b. 1 September 1958, d.13 August 1999) was a Pakistani writer from Sindh Pakistan.

Early life
According to the Sindhi Affairnews Karachi, Jiskani was born to Jaam Khan Jiskani on 1 September 1958 at Johi, Pakistan. Jiskani became orphan in childhood when his father died in Saudi Arabia. Jiskani's grandmother raised him. He earned a Master's degree in Sindhi literature.

Career
Akbar Jiskani wrote short stories and novels. He authored four books of short stories and novels. He was a prominent writer for children's Sindhi literature. After his death a memorial library for him was established in Johi in 1999. Under the chairmanship of Makhdoom Muhammad Zaman Talibul Moula, Muhammad Ibrahim Joyo and others Jiskani remained editor of children's magazine Gul Phul by Sindhi Adabi Board Jamshoro , Sindh. His unnatural death has not been resolved.

Death
Jiskani died on 13 August 1999 in Sehrish Nagar , Hyderabad, Sindh, Pakistan.

References 

Sindhi-language writers
Writers from Sindh
1999 deaths
1958 births